Warehouse Theatre was a professional producing theatre in the centre of Croydon, England.

Warehouse Theatre may also refer to:

Warehouse Theatre (Stephens) at Stephens College in Columbia, Missouri
Warehouse Theatre (Washington, D.C), see Forum Theatre (Washington, D.C.)
The Warehouse Theatre in Weymouth, England
Former name of the Donmar Warehouse in London